Janus Lascaris (Ianos Laskaris; c. 1445, Constantinople – 7 December 1535, Rome), also called John Rhyndacenus (from Rhyndacus, a country town in Asia Minor), was a noted Greek scholar in the Renaissance.

Biography
After the Fall of Constantinople Lascaris was taken to the Peloponnese and to Crete. When still quite young he came to Venice, where Bessarion became his patron, and sent him to learn Latin at the University of Padua.

On the death of Bessarion, Lorenzo de' Medici welcomed him to Florence, where Lascaris gave Greek lectures on Thucydides, Demosthenes, Sophocles, and the Greek Anthology. Lorenzo sent him twice to Greece in quest of manuscripts. When he returned the second time (1492) he brought back about two hundred from Mount Athos.

Meanwhile, Lorenzo had died. Lascaris entered the service of the Kingdom of France and was ambassador at Venice from 1503 to 1508, at which time he became a member of the New Academy of Aldus Manutius; but if the printer had the benefit of his advice, no Aldine work bears his name. He resided at Rome under Leo X, the first pope of the Medici family, from 1513 to 1518, returned under Clement VII in 1523, and Paul III in 1534.

In the meantime he had assisted Louis XII in forming the library of Blois, and when Francis I had it removed to Fontainebleau, Lascaris and Guillaume Budé had charge of its organization.

We owe to him a number of editiones principes, among them the Anthologia Graeca (1494), four plays of Euripides, Callimachus (about 1495), Apollonius Rhodius, Lucian (1496), printed in Florence in Greek capitals with accents, the scholia of Didymas (Rome 1517) and of Porphyrius (1518) on Homer (Rome 1518), and the scholia vetera on Sophocles (Rome 1518).

Among his pupils were Alessandra Scala, Marco Musuro, Germain de Brie, Dimitrije Ljubavić, and Jacques Dubois.

He was buried in the gothic church of Sant'Agata de' Goti, Rome. On his memorial the following epigram is inscribed, composed by himself:

ΛΑΣΚΑΡΙΣ ΑΛΛΟΔΑΠΗ ΓΑΙΗ ΕΝΙΚΑΤΘΕΤΟ ΓΑΙΗΝ, ΟΥΤΙ ΛΙΗΝ ΞΕΙΝΗΝ, Ω ΞΕΝΕ, ΜΕΜΦΟΜΕΝΟΣ. ΕΥΡΕΤΟ ΜΕΙΛΙΧΙΗΝ. ΑΛΛ' ΑΧΘΕΤΑΙ ΕΙΠΕΡ ΑΧΑΙΟΙΣ. ΟΥΔ' ΕΤΙ ΧΟΥΝ ΧΕΥΕΙ ΠΑΤΡΙΣ ΕΛΕΥΘΕΡΙΟΝ.

i.e., Lascaris in foreign land deposited his earth [his body], and he does not blame her [the land] that she is very foreign, oh stranger. He found her sweet. But he is worried about the Achaeans [the Greeks], because their country does not cover them with free soil.

See also
French humanism
Greek scholars in the Renaissance
Laskaris family

Notes

References

 Jonathan Harris, Greek Émigrés in the West, 1400-1520 (Camberley: Porphyrogenitus, 1995). 
 Graham Speake, ‘Janus Lascaris’ visit to Mount Athos in 1491’, Greek, Roman and Byzantine Studies 34 (1993), 325–30.
 Francis Walton, ‘Janus Laskaris’, The Griffon 10 (1984), 8-35
 J. Whittaker, ‘Janus Laskaris at the court of Charles V’, Thesaurismata 14 (1977), 76-109
 N.G. Wilson, From Byzantium to Italy. Greek Studies in the Italian Renaissance (London, 1992).

External links

 

1440s births
1535 deaths
Greek Renaissance humanists
Constantinopolitan Greeks
15th-century Byzantine people
16th-century Greek people
16th-century Greek educators
15th-century Greek educators
People from Constantinople